Seymour Aubrey Papert (29 February 1928 – 31 July 2016) was a South African-born American mathematician, computer scientist, and educator, who spent most of his career teaching and researching at MIT. He was one of the pioneers of artificial intelligence, and of the constructionist movement in education. He was co-inventor, with Wally Feurzeig and Cynthia Solomon, of the Logo programming language.

Early years and education
Born to a Jewish family, Papert attended the University of the Witwatersrand, receiving a Bachelor of Arts degree in philosophy in 1949 followed by a PhD in mathematics in 1952. He then went on to receive a second doctorate, also in mathematics, at the University of Cambridge (1959), supervised by Frank Smithies.

Career
Papert worked as a researcher in a variety of places, including St. John's College, Cambridge, the Henri Poincaré Institute at the University of Paris, the University of Geneva, and the National Physical Laboratory in London before becoming a research associate at MIT in 1963. He held this position until 1967, when he became professor of applied math and was made co-director of the MIT Artificial Intelligence Laboratory by its founding director Professor Marvin Minsky, until 1981; he also served as Cecil and Ida Green professor of education at MIT from 1974 to 1981.

Research
Papert worked on learning theories, and was known for focusing on the impact of new technologies on learning in general, and in schools as learning organizations in particular.

Constructionism
At MIT, Papert went on to create the Epistemology and Learning Research Group at the MIT Architecture Machine Group which later became the MIT Media Lab. Here, he was the developer of a theory on learning called constructionism, built upon the work of Jean Piaget in constructivist learning theories. Papert had worked with Piaget at the University of Geneva from 1958 to 1963 and was one of Piaget's protégés; Piaget himself once said that "no one understands my ideas as well as Papert". Papert has rethought how schools should work, based on these theories of learning.

Logo
Papert used Piaget's work in his development of the Logo programming language while at MIT. He created Logo as a tool to improve the way children think and solve problems. A small mobile robot called the "Logo Turtle" was developed, and children were shown how to use it to solve simple problems in an environment of play. A main purpose of the Logo Foundation research group is to strengthen the ability to learn knowledge. Papert insisted a simple language or program that children can learn—like Logo—can also have advanced functionality for expert users.

Other work
As part of his work with technology, Papert has been a proponent of the Knowledge Machine. He was one of the principals for the One Laptop Per Child initiative to manufacture and distribute The Children's Machine in developing nations.

Papert also collaborated with the construction toy manufacturer Lego on their Logo-programmable Lego Mindstorms robotics kits, which were named after his groundbreaking 1980 book.

A curated archive of Papert's articles, speeches, and interviews may be found at The Daily Papert.

Personal life
Papert became a political and anti-apartheid activist early in his life in South Africa. He subsequently chose self exile. He was a leading figure in the revolutionary socialist circle around Socialist Review while living in London in the 1950s. Papert was also a prominent activist against South African apartheid policies during his university education.

Papert was married to Dona Strauss, and later to Androula Christofides Henriques.

Papert's third wife was MIT professor Sherry Turkle, and together they wrote the influential paper "Epistemological Pluralism and the Revaluation of the Concrete".

In his final 24 years, Papert was married to Suzanne Massie, who is a Russian scholar and author of Pavlovsk: The Life of a Russian Palace and Land of the Firebird.

Accident in Hanoi
Papert (then aged 78), received a serious brain injury when struck by a motor scooter on 5 December 2006 while crossing the street with colleague Uri Wilensky when they were both attending the 17th International Commission on Mathematical Instruction (ICMI) Study conference in Hanoi, Vietnam. He underwent emergency surgery to remove a blood clot at the French Hospital of Hanoi before being transferred in a complex operation by Swiss Air Ambulance (REGA) Bombardier Challenger Jet to Boston, Massachusetts. He was moved to a hospital closer to his home in January 2007, but then developed sepsis which damaged a heart valve, which was later replaced.

By 2008 he had returned home, could think and communicate clearly and walk "almost unaided", but still had "some complicated speech problems" and was in receipt of extensive rehabilitation support. His rehabilitation team used some of the very principles of experiential, hands-on learning that he had pioneered.

Papert died at his home in Blue Hill, Maine, on 31 July 2016.

Awards, honours, and legacy
Papert's work has been used by other researchers in the fields of education and computer science. He influenced the work of Uri Wilensky in the design of NetLogo and collaborated with him on the study of knowledge restructurations, as well as the work of Andrea diSessa and the development of "dynaturtles". In 1981, Papert along with several others in the Logo group at MIT, started Logo Computer Systems Inc. (LCSI), of which he was board chair for over 20 years. Working with LCSI, Papert designed a number of award-winning programs, including LogoWriter and Lego/Logo (marketed as Lego Mindstorms).  He also influenced the research of Idit Harel Caperton, coauthoring articles and the book Constructionism, and chairing the advisory board of the company MaMaMedia. He also influenced Alan Kay and the Dynabook concept, and worked with Kay on various projects.

Papert won a Guggenheim fellowship in 1980, a Marconi International fellowship in 1981, the Software Publishers Association Lifetime Achievement Award in 1994, and the Smithsonian Award from Computerworld in 1997. Papert has been called by Marvin Minsky "the greatest living mathematics educator".

MIT President L. Rafael Reif summarized Papert's lifetime of accomplishments: "With a mind of extraordinary range and creativity, Seymour Papert helped revolutionize at least three fields, from the study of how children make sense of the world, to the development of artificial intelligence, to the rich intersection of technology and learning. The stamp he left on MIT is profound. Today, as MIT continues to expand its reach and deepen its work in digital learning, I am particularly grateful for Seymour's groundbreaking vision, and we hope to build on his ideas to open doors to learners of all ages, around the world."

In 2016 Papert's alma mater, University of Witwatersrand, awarded him the degree of "Doctor of Science in Engineering, honoris causa".

See also

References

Selected bibliography
 Counter-free automata, 1971, 
 Perceptrons, (with Marvin Minsky), MIT Press, 1969 (Enlarged edition, 1988), 
 Mindstorms: Children, Computers, and Powerful Ideas, 1980, 
 Papert, S. & Harel, I. (eds). (1991) Constructionism: research reports and essays 1985–1990 by the Epistemology and Learning Research Group, the Media Lab, Massachusetts Institute of Technology, Ablex Pub. Corp, Norwood, NJ.
 The Children's Machine: Rethinking School in the Age of the Computer, 1993, 
 The Connected Family: Bridging the Digital Generation Gap, 1996,

External links

 Seymour Papert Print Archives at The Daily Papert
 Seymour Papert Audio & Video Archives at The Daily Papert
 

1928 births
2016 deaths
Artificial intelligence researchers
American cognitive psychologists
Computer science educators
Lisp (programming language) people
Mathematics educators
People with traumatic brain injuries
Programming language designers
Socialist Workers Party (UK) members
South African computer scientists
South African educational theorists
South African mathematicians
South African Jews
20th-century American Jews
American people of Lithuanian-Jewish descent
University of Geneva alumni
Jewish South African anti-apartheid activists
MIT Media Lab people
20th-century South African mathematicians
21st-century South African mathematicians
White South African anti-apartheid activists
21st-century American Jews